Kenneth Hugh de Courcy was an editor of the British subscription newsletter Intelligence Digest, as well as a confidant of British King Edward VIII. In the 1940s, de Courcy was part of a scheme dreamed up by some conservative members of the British royal court to return the Duke and Duchess of Windsor to Britain and establish a regency.

Life and career 
Kenneth de Courcy was born in Galway, Ireland in 1909. He became wealthy as a businessman, owning a chain of tobacco shops and other businesses.

In 1934, de Courcy became secretary of the Imperial Policy Group, a grouping of right-wing Conservative MPs, which focused on "the importance of Imperial development" and "close friendship with the United States". Later the group supported appeasement of Nazi Germany as the best means of preserving the British Empire, and in that capacity de Courcy travelled Europe making high-level contacts.

In 1934, he founded Courcy's Intelligence Service to provide early warning intelligence to businesses and the government. Four years later he began Intelligence Digest (now Courcy’s Intelligence Brief, together with The Weekly Review. He was joined in the business by a cousin, John de Courcy, 35th Baron Kingsale.

De Courcy was accused in the War Cabinet minutes of 13 April 1942 of being "up to mischief" by "writing poisonous publications about the Russians". In 1952 on the death of George VI he wrote to Winston Churchill suggesting Elizabeth II develop a closer relationship with the abdicated King Edward, now living abroad.

In 1950, de Courcy married Rosemary Catherine Baker, who was also from Ireland. They had four children. The marriage was dissolved in 1973.

Between 1953 and 1964 he was a member of the committee of the Evangelical Alliance which organised Billy Graham's 'crusades' in Great Britain. At several points in his life de Courcy believed the British Security Service (MI5) was intercepting his mail and telephone communications.

In the 1960s, via a company called Sarsden Consolidated Properties, de Courcy planned a garden city development in Southern Rhodesia (now Zimbabwe). He was unable to return the funds put up by investors and was jailed for seven years for fraud. De Courcy escaped from custody when he was allowed to visit his lawyer as part of his appeal, although he was recaptured.

De Courcy went on to edit publications such as Banker's Digest and Special Office Brief.

In December 2005, an appeal to De Courcy's 1964 court case was upheld as a miscarriage of justice by the Criminal Cases Review Commission.

References 

1909 births
1999 deaths
Print editors